Below is a list of speakers of the Australian House of Representatives.

The parties shown are those to which the speakers belonged at the time they held office.

List

References

Speakers of the Australian House of Representatives
Speakers, House of Representatives